Lewis McComb Pitchford (11 June 1903 – 25 July 1969) was an Australian rules footballer who played with North Melbourne in the Victorian Football League (VFL).

Football
Originally playing with Mornington, Pitchford trialled with Fitzroy in 1923 before playing with St Patricks in Albury in 1926.

Pitchford moved to North Melbourne in 1927 and played 51 games over the next four seasons for the club.

In 1931 he was appointed as captain-coach of Ballarat Imperials.

War service
Pitchford later served in the Australian Army during World War II.

Death
Pitchford died in Hobart on 25 July 1969 and is buried at Cornelian Bay Cemetery.

Notes

External links 

1903 births
Australian rules footballers from Victoria (Australia)
North Melbourne Football Club players
Ballarat Imperial Football Club players
Longford Football Club players
1969 deaths
Burials in Tasmania
Australian Army personnel of World War II
People from Mornington, Victoria
Military personnel from Victoria (Australia)